Jourda is a surname. Notable people with the surname include:

Albert Jourda (1892–?), French footballer
Françoise-Hélène Jourda (1955–2015), French architect
Noël Jourda de Vaux (1705–1788), French nobleman and General

See also
Jourdan